Platinum Awards (Sinhala:සිරස ප්ලැටිනම් සම්මාන)  is an award bestowed to distinguished individuals involved with the sports in Sri Lanka, who lifted the country in local and international level. The award will present in each year by the MTV / MBC Network in collaboration with many sponsors. The first Platinum awards were held in 2014. Platinum Awards, is the first ever sports awards ceremony started in Sri Lanka and thus dubbed “The Oscars of sports awards ceremonies in Sri Lanka”.

2014 Platinum Awards
The press conference about the launch of the Sports1st Mobitel Platinum Awards Ceremony was held on 26 September 2014. Capital Maharaja news network called News First collaborated with Mobitel Sri Lanka to launch first Platinum Awards in 2014. To educate the people about the ceremony, a promotion vehicle travelled from one village to village by starting the journey from Jaffna on 29 September 2014.

Applications for the Most Popular Sportsperson could be handed over to the promotion vehicle, which closed on October 31, 2014. Over 5,000 applications were received for the 21 award categories at the First Platinum Awards. The Awards night was held on 30 November 2014 at Sirasa Stein Studios, Ratmalana. Sri Lanka national cricket captain Angelo Mathews won the Most Popular Sports Person of The Year Award.

Jury panel
 Sunil Gunawardena
 Susanthika Jayasinghe
 Julian Bolling
 Dilroy Fernando
 Kishu Gomes 
 Hemaka Amarasuriya

Award winners
Award for the Most Talented School Cricketer - Tharinda Mendis of Dharmashoka Vidyalaya, Ambalangoda 
Award for the Most Talented School Rugby Player - Omalka Gunaratne of Isipathana College, Colombo
Award for the Best Outstation School Athlete - Himasha Eashan of Kalutara Vidyalaya
Award for the Best School Sports Team - Rugby Team of Isipathana College
Award for the Best Upcoming Sports Woman of the Year - Kimiko Raheem 
Award for the Best Upcoming Sportsman Of The Year - Akila Ravisanka 
Award for the Best University Sportsperson of The Year - Nisansala Weerasinghe  
Award for the Best PTI Teacher Of The Year - A D Nandawathi 
Award for the Best Military Sportsperson of The Year - Yoshitha Rajapaksa
Award for the Best Comeback Sportsperson of The Year - Anurudha Rathnayake
Award for the Best Action Sportsperson of the Year (Motor Sports) - Dilantha Malagamuwa
Award for the Best Para Sportsperson Of The Year - Pradeep Sanjaya
Award for the Best Coach Of The Year - Srimal Aponsu
Award for the Best Team Of The Year - Sri Lanka Navy Rugby Team
Award for the Best Schools Sportswoman of the Year - Machiko Raheem
Award for the Best School Sportsman of the Year - Shasika Ekanayaka
Award for the Best Sportswoman of the Year - Chandrika Subashini
Award for the Best Sportsmen of the Year - Indika Dissanayake
Award for the Best Woman Cricketer Of The Year - Chamari Atapattu
Award for the Best Cricketer of the Year - Angelo Mathews
Lifetime Achievement Award - Arjuna Ranatunga for his contribution to cricket and winning 1996 Cricket World Cup
Most Popular Sports Person of The Year - Angelo Mathews

2016 Platinum Awards
The second Platinum ceremony launching started with January 2017, with the full support of the Ministry of Education. Nominations for Platinum Awards 2017 opened under 20 categories. The promotional campaign commenced at Thurstan College, Colombo on 30 January 2017. The campaign was held in every district in the island until the 28 February 2017. The Awards night was held on 31 March 2017 at Sirasa Stein Studios, Ratmalana. Five times world champion in Lamborghini motor racing, Dilantha Malagamuwa won the Most Popular Sports Person of The Year Award.

Jury panel
Damayanthi Darsha
Sriyani Kulawansa
Tillakaratne Dilshan
Julian Bolling
Arjuna Fernando
Dilroy Fernando
Talavou F. Alailima
Kishu Gomes
Ruwan Keragala 
Upali Amaratunga

Award winners
Award for the Emerging Sportswoman of the Year - Rumeshika Rathnayake of St. Joseph Balika Vidyalaya, Kegalle
Award for the Emerging Sportman of the Year - Kusal Mendis of Prince of Wales' College, Moratuwa
Award for the Best School Sports Team - Rugby Team of Isipathana College
Award for the PTI Teacher Of The Year - Amalka Chandani
Award for the University Sportsperson of The Year - Sumedha Ranasinghe
Award for the Para Sportsperson Of The Year - Dinesh Priyantha
Award for the Action Sportsperson of the Year (Motor Sports) - Dilantha Malagamuwa
Award for the Military Sportswoman of The Year - Niluka Geethani Rajasekara
Award for the Military Sportsman of The Year - Himasha Eashan
Award for the Coach Of The Year - Anuruddha Bandara and Pradeep Nishantha
Award for the National Team Of The Year - Kandy Sports Club Rugby Team
Award for the International Team Of The Year - Sri Lanka National Carrom Team
Award for the Junior Sportswoman of the Year - Hansini Piyumila
Award for the Junior Sportsman of the Year - Udara Ranasinghe
Award for the Outstanding Sportswoman of the Year - Kimiko Raheem
Award for the Outstanding Sportsman of the Year - Matthew Abeysinghe
Award for the Woman Cricketer Of The Year - Chamari Atapattu
Award for the Cricketer of the Year - Rangana Herath
Merit Award - Sri Lanka national blind cricket team
Medal Honors - Kyle Abeysinghe in Swimming
Medal Honors - Yamini Dulanjalee in 400M Hurdles
Medal Honors - Ramudi Samarakoon in Swimming
Medal Honors - Ruwan Fonseka in Karate
Medal Honors - Chamil Cooray in Carrom
Lifetime Achievement Award - Susanthika Jayasinghe for her contribution to athletics and winning silver medal at 2000 Olympics
Most Popular Sports Person of The Year - Dilantha Malagamuwa

2018 Allianz Platinum Awards
The press conference of the award ceremony was held on 14 January 2019 at Sports Ministry Race Course. The third Platinum Awards night was held on 29 March 2019 at Sirasa Stein Studios, Ratmalana. 20 awards have been awarded to the excellence in sports across the country and across the world. World Bodybuilding Champion, Lucion Pushparaj won the Most Popular Sports Person of The Year Award.

Award winners
Award for the Emerging Sportswoman of the Year - Parami Wasanthi Maristela (athletics)
Award for the Emerging Sportman of the Year - Akalanka Peiris (swimming)
Award for the Junior Sportswoman of the Year - Parami Wasanthi Maristela (athletics)
Award for the Junior Sportsman of the Year - Anura Darshana (athletics)
Award for the Best School Sports Team - Basketball Team of Royal College, Colombo
Award for the PTI Teacher Of The Year - Janitha Jayasinghe (Kuliyapitiya Central College)
Award for the University Sportsperson of The Year - Erandi Dilushika (University of Sri Jayewardenepura)
Award for the Para Sportsperson Of The Year - Dinesh Priyantha
Award for the Action Sportsperson of the Year (Motor Sports) - Ashan Silva
Award for the National Team Of The Year - Kandy Sports Club Rugby Team
Award for the International Team Of The Year - Sri Lanka national netball team
Award for the Military Sportswoman of The Year - Dinusha Hansani Gomes (SL Air Force)
Award for the Military Sportsman of The Year - Indika Dissanayake
Award for the Coach Of The Year - Pradeep Nishantha (athletics)
Award for the Woman Cricketer Of The Year - Chamari Atapattu
Award for the Cricketer of the Year - Dimuth Karunaratne
Award for the Outstanding Sportswoman of the Year - Anusha Koddithuwakku (Boxing)
Award for the Outstanding Sportsman of the Year - Indika Dissanayake (Weightlifting)
Lifetime Achievement Award - Muttiah Muralitharan for his contribution to cricket and record holder for highest wickets in Test and ODI cricket.
Most Popular Sports Person of The Year - Lucion Pushparaj

References

2014 establishments in Sri Lanka
Awards established in 2014
Capital Maharaja
Sri Lankan sports trophies and awards